Christophe is a male given name and surname. It is a French variant of Christopher.

People using Christophe as a pseudonym 
 Christophe (Georges Colomb) (1856–1945), French comic strip artist and botanist
 Christophe (singer) (1945-2020), French singer

Notable people with the given name Christophe 
 Christophe Barratier, French filmmaker
Christophe Beck, Canadian composer
 Christophe Dumaux, French opera singer
 Christophe Gans, French filmmaker
 Christophe Keckeis, chief of the Swiss Armed Forces
Christophe Lemaitre, French Sprinter
 Christophe Moreau, French cyclist
 Christophe Naegelen (born 1983), French politician
Christophe Revault (1972–2021), French footballer
 Christophe Rinero, French cyclist
 Christophe Soulé, French mathematician

Notable people with the surname Christophe 

Eugène Christophe, French cyclist
Henri Christophe, first King of Haiti
 Paul Christophe (born 1971), French politician

See also 
 Christophe (disambiguation)
 Christoph, German variant

Given names
Surnames
French masculine given names
French-language surnames
Surnames of French origin